P2X purinoceptor 1 is a protein that in humans is encoded by the P2RX1 gene.

The product of this gene belongs to the family of purinoceptors for ATP. This receptor functions as a ligand-gated ion channel with relatively high calcium permeability. Expressed in smooth muscle and platelets.  Binding to ATP mediates synaptic transmission between neurons and from neurons to smooth muscle, being responsible, for example, for sympathetic vasoconstriction in small arteries, arterioles and vas deferens. Mouse studies suggest that this receptor is essential for normal male reproductive function. It is possible that the development of selective antagonists for this receptor may provide an effective non-hormonal male contraceptive pill.

See also
 P2X receptor

References

Further reading

External links 
 

Ion channels